West Sedgemoor or West Sedge Moor is an area of the Somerset Levels, in Somerset, England, around 8 miles (13 km) east of Taunton, which approximately coincides with the West Sedgemoor biological Site of Special Scientific Interest, a 1,016 hectare (3.9 sq miles) site notified as an SSSI in 1983. It is a flat, low-lying area (approx. 5 metres above sea level) of fields and meadows separated by water-filled rhynes and ditches. It is subject to controlled flooding in winter. It is drained by the River Parrett.

Part of the moor is a Royal Society for the Protection of Birds reserve. A rich invertebrate fauna is present including scarce water beetles, dragonflies and bugs. The site also supports good populations of waterfowl, especially waders.
Breeding birds include snipe, lapwing, redshank, curlew, water rail, yellow wagtail and whinchat.

Swell Wood, an ancient deciduous wood on the southern edge of the reserve, has one of the UK's largest heronries, which is best visited between March and June.

References 

Sites of Special Scientific Interest in Somerset
Nature reserves in Somerset
Royal Society for the Protection of Birds reserves in England
Sites of Special Scientific Interest notified in 1983
Somerset Levels